Nisith Pramanik (born 17 January 1986) is an Indian politician and a Union Minister of State, Ministry of Home Affairs and Minister of State, Ministry of Youth Affairs and Sports  from West Bengal. He was elected to the Lok Sabha, lower house of the Parliament of India from Cooch Behar, West Bengal in the 2019 Indian general election as a member of the Bharatiya Janata Party.

Personal life
Pramanik was born on 17 January 1986 to Bidhu Bhushan Pramanik and Chhanda Pramanik in Dinhata, Cooch Behar District, West Bengal, India. He has Bachelor of Computer Applications (BCA). He was an assistant teacher at a primary school. He is married to Priyanka Pramanik, with whom he has two sons.

Political career

He was also a member of All India Trinamool Congress (AITC) before joining the BJP in March 2019. 
In July 2021, he became Minister of Home Affairs and Minister of State, Ministry of Youth Affairs and Sports in Second Modi ministry after the Cabinet reshuffle. As of 2021, at the age of 35 he became the youngest minister in the Union Cabinet.

Controversy
In July 2021, his nationality created debate in the Indian political circle after Congress' Rajya Sabha MP Ripun Bora wrote a letter alleging Pramanik of being a Bangladeshi national to the Prime Minister to investigate his nationality.
Leader of the Opposition in Rajya Sabha, Mallikarjun Kharge also questioned his citizenship, while TMC Rajya Sabha MP Sukhendu Sekhar Roy also alleged he is a Bangladeshi citing his Wikipedia page as a reference.
The Leader of the Rajya Sabha, BJP MP Piyush Goyal, however, called the allegations baseless.

References

External links
 Official biographical sketch in Parliament of India website

Narendra Modi ministry
1986 births
Living people
India MPs 2019–present
Lok Sabha members from West Bengal
Bharatiya Janata Party politicians from West Bengal
West Bengal MLAs 2021–2026
People from Cooch Behar district